Olapa, goddess of the moon, is married to Enkai (Ngai), god of the sun in Maasai mythology.

Mythology 
The two fought one day, and Olapa, being a short tempered woman, inflicted Enkai with a wound. To hide his shame, he took to shining very brightly, so that no one could look straight at him. In revenge, Enkai hit Olapa back and struck out one of her eyes. This can be seen today, when the moon is full.

Name 
The word for moon and month (olapa) carries the masculine gender form 'ol' in the prefix.

External links
 Naomi Kipury: Oral Literature of the Maasai (1983: East African Educational Publishers Ltd., PO Box 45314 Nairobi, Kenya)
The myth of the sun and the moon

Lunar goddesses
Religion in Kenya
Maasai deities